Katharina Grosse (born 2 October 1961) is a German artist. As an artist, Grosse's work employs a use of architecture, sculpture and painting. She is known for her large-scale, site-related installations to create immersive visual experiences. She has been using an industrial paint-sprayer to apply prismatic swaths of color to a variety of surfaces since the late 1990s, and often uses bright, unmixed sprayed-on acrylic paints to create both large-scale sculptural elements and smaller wall works.

Life and education
Grosse was born in 1961 in Freiburg im Breisgau, Germany.

Grosse studied at the art academies in Münster and Düsseldorf and taught at the Art Academy Berlin-Weissensee from 2000 to 2010. 2010–2018 professor for painting at the Kunstakademie Düsseldorf.

Grosse lives and works in Berlin.

Art market
Grosse was represented by Johann König until 2022.

Public commissions (selected)
Untitled, Greater Toronto Airports Authority (2003)
Seven Days Time, Kunstmuseum Bonn (2011)
Blue Orange, Vara Bahnhof, Sweden (2012 design)
Just Two Of Us, MetroTech Commons, Public Art Fund, New York (2013)
Untitled, Ehrenhof Düsseldorf (2014)
Untitled,  The Cologne Public Transport Company - KVB, stop Chlodwigplatz, Cologne (2015)
Untitled, Marie-Elisabeth-Lüders-Haus, Berlin (commissioned by Federal Republic of Germany for House of Representatives) (2015)
Untitled, Washington University in St. Louis, MO, USA (commissioned by the Gary M. Sumers Recreation Center) (2016)
Rockaway!, for MoMA PS1, Fort Tilden, NY (2016)
 Mural, for Museum of Fine Arts, Boston, MA (2019)

Collections

Grosse's work is held in the following permanent collections:
Museum of Modern Art, New York
QAGOMA, Brisbane, Australia
Centre Georges Pompidou, Paris
Pomeranz Collection
Collection Societé Generale

Awards

Villa Romana Prize, Florence, Italy  (1992)
Schmidt-Rottluff Stipend, Germany (1993)  
Stiftung Kunstfonds Bonn, Germany (1995)
The Chinati Foundation's Artist in Residence program, Marfa, TX, USA (1999 )
Artist in Residence at Elam School of Fine Art program, Auckland, New Zealand (2001)
Andy Warhol Residency Award, Headlands Foundation, San Francisco, CA, USA (2002)
Fred Thieler Award, Berlin (2003)
Oskar-Schlemmer-Award, Great State Prize for Visual Arts of Baden-Wuerttemberg (2014)
Otto-Ritschl-Kunstpreis (2015)

Publications (catalogues)
Location, Location, Location. Contributions by Steffen Bodekker, Roman Kurzmeyer, Judy Millar, Retrograde Strategies Cooperative, Angela Schneider, Beat Wismer, Düsseldorf, 2002.
Katharina Grosse. Kunstverein Ruhr. Contribution by Peter Friese, Essen 2002.
Cool Puppen / Der weisse Saal trifft sich im Wald / Ich wüsste jetzt nichts. Ikon Gallery, Birmingham; Städtische Galerie im Lenbachhaus, München; Kunstmuseum St. Gallen, St. Gallen; Kunsthalle zu Kiel, Kiel. Contributions by Marion Ackermann, Beate Ermacora, Jonathan Watkins, Roland Wäspe, Wolfratshausen 2002.
Katharina Grosse. Fred Thieler Preis für Malerei 2003. Berlinische Galerie, Berlin. Contribution by Armin Zweite, Berlin 2003.
Infinite Logic Conference. Magasin 3 Stockholm Konsthall, Sweden. Contributions by Richard Julin, Lars Mikael Raattamaa, Stockholm 2004.
Double Floor Painting. Kunsthallen Brandts Klaedefabrik, Denmark. Contributions by Lene Burkard, Tor Nørretranders, Cecilie Bepler, Odense 2004.
Holey Residue. de Appel, Amsterdam. Contribution by Janneke Wesseling, Amsterdam 2006.
Picture Park. Queensland Art Gallery/Gallery of Modern Art. Contributions by Nicholas Chambers, Robert Leonard, Brisbane 2007.
The Poise of the Head und die anderen folgen. Kunstmuseum Bochum. Contributions by Hans Gunther Golinski and Katharina Grosse, Nuremberg 2007.
Atoms Outside Eggs. Museu de Arte Contemporânea (Fundação de Serralves), Porto. Contributions by Leonhard Emmerling, Ulrich Loock, Porto 2007.
Another Man Who Has Dropped his Paintbrush. Galleria Civica di Modena. Contributions by Arno Brandlhuber & Katharina Grosse, Milovan Farronato, Angela Vettese, Cologne 2008.
The Flowershow / SKROW NO REPAP. FRAC Auvergne, Clermont-Ferrand. Contribution by Jean-Charles Vergne, Cologne 2008.
Ich wünsche mir ein grosses Atelier im Zentrum der Stadt. Contributions by Georg Augustin, Laura Bieger, Andreas Denk, Ulrich Loock, Philip Ursprung, Baden, Switzerland 2009.
Shadowbox. Temporäre Kunsthalle Berlin. Contributions by Laura Bieger, Katja Blomberg, Uta Degner, Antje Dietze, Alexander Koch, Gerd G. Kopper, Cologne 2009.
Atoms Inside Balloons. The Renaissance Society at the University of Chicago, Chicago, ILL, USA. Contributions by David Hilbert, Nana Last and Hamza Walker, Chicago 2009.
Barbara und Katharina Grosse. Museum für Neue Kunst Freiburg. Contributions by Walter von Lucadou, Isabel Herda, Nuremberg 2010.
Transparent Eyeballs. Quadriennale 2010, Kunsthalle Düsseldorf. Contributions by Gregor Jansem, Annika Reich, Uwe Vetter, Düsseldorf 2011.
Eat child eat. Contribution by Ulrich Wilmes, Berlin, 2011.
One floor up more highly. MASS MoCA, MA, North Adams, USA. Contribution by Susan Cross, Massachusetts 2012.
Wunderblock, Nasher Sculpture Center, Dallas, TX, USA. Contributions by Jeremy Strick, Catherine Craft, Dallas 2013.
Katharina Grosse. Monograph. Contributions and published by Ulrich Loock, Annika Reich, Katharina Grosse, Cologne 2013.
Wer, ich? Wen, Du?. Kunsthaus Graz, Austria. Contributions by Peter Pakesch, Katrin Bucher Trantow, Adam Budak, Graz 2014.
Inside the Speaker. Museum Kunstpalast, Düsseldorf. Contributions by Dustin Breitenwischer, Philipp Kaiser, Ulrich Loock, Beat Wismer, Cologne 2014.
psychylustro. City of Philadelphia Mural Arts Program. Contributions by Douglas Ashford, Anthony Elms, Jane Golden, Daniel Marcus, Elizabeth Thomas, Cologne 2015.
Katharina Grosse: Seven Hours, Eight Voices, Three Trees.  Museum Wiesbaden. Contributions by Ann Cotten, Dustin Breitenwischer, Jörg Daur, Alexander Klar, Sally McGrane, Teresa Präauer, Annika Reich, Monika Rinck, Cologne, 2015.
Katharina Grosse. Museum Frieder Burda. Contributions by Helmut Friedel and Katrin Dillkofer (both in German), Cologne, 2016.

See also
 List of German women artists

References 

1961 births
German contemporary artists
Living people
Academic staff of the Weißensee Academy of Art Berlin
Artists from Freiburg im Breisgau
Academic staff of Kunstakademie Düsseldorf